Île Saint-Lanne Gramont is an uninhabited island, the fourth largest island in the Kerguelen Islands, situated to the north of presqu'île de la Société de géographie, with an area of 45.8 km2. The island is elongated along a north–south axis, reaching a maximum length of 13 km and a maximum width of 3 km. It is free of introduced animals.

Important Bird Area
The island, along with the neighbouring, and relatively large, islands of Île Foch and Île Howe, as well as the smaller Île MacMurdo, Île Briand, Îles Dayman and Îlots Hallet, has been identified by BirdLife International as an Important Bird Area (IBA) because of its value as a breeding site, especially for seabirds, with at least 29 species nesting in the IBA.

References

External links
 Geoportail - Carte des îles Kerguelen
 World of islands - Île Saint-Lanne Gramont

Important Bird Areas of Kerguelen
Saint-Lanne Gramont